Karangalan Village is a residential area located at Barangay San Isidro, in Cainta, Rizal, Philippines. The village is home to the regional office of Department of Education for Calabarzon (Region IV-A).

References

Cainta